The 1992 WPI Engineers football team represented Worcester Polytechnic Institute in the 1992 NCAA Division III football season. It marked the Engineers' 103rd overall season and the team played its home games in Worcester, Massachusetts. They were led by fifth-year head coach Jack Siedlecki. They were a member of the Freedom Football Conference (FFC). The Engineers finished the season 9–2 and earned the school's first-ever bid to the NCAA Division III Football Championship playoffs.

Schedule

Schedule Source:

Awards and honors

Weekly awards
Freedom Football Conference Offensive Player of the Week
 Dave Ceppetelli - Week of September 13, 1992

Freedom Football Conference Offensive Player of the Week
 Peter Perivolarakis - Week of September 13, 1992

Annual awards
 Freedom Football Conference Rookie of the Year
 Ernie Ansah

References

WPI
WPI Engineers football seasons
WPI Engineers football